The Uruguayan Permanent Representative in New York City  is the official representative to the Headquarters of the United Nations.

List of representatives

References 

 
United Nations
Uruguay